The West Allegheny School District is a midsized, suburban public school district which is located in the western corner of Allegheny County, approximately  from downtown Pittsburgh. The district comprises Findlay Township, North Fayette Township, and the Oakdale Borough. The West Allegheny School District is home of the Pittsburgh International Airport terminal. West Allegheny was formed in 1949.

Facilities
 West Allegheny Senior High School (Grades 9–12) – Located in North Fayette Township on Main Campus, 205 West Allegheny Road, Imperial, PA, 15126
 West Allegheny Middle School (Grades 6–8) – Located in North Fayette Township on Main Campus, 207 West Allegheny Road, Imperial, PA, 15126
 Donaldson Elementary School (Grades K-5) – Located in North Fayette Township, 600 Donaldson Road, Oakdale, PA 15071
 McKee Elementary School (Grades K-5) – Located in North Fayette Township, 1501 Oakdale Road, Oakdale, PA 15071
 Wilson Elementary School (Grades K-5) – Located in Findlay Township, 110 Bruno Lane, Imperial, PA 15126
 West Allegheny District Offices – Located in Findlay Township, 110 Bruno Lane, Imperial, PA 15126

Football: team history

The high school's football team was founded along with the school district in 1949. The team has become a powerhouse program in both the WPIAL and the PIAA over the past 20 years under head coach Bob Palko. Under Palko's leadership, the Indians have won 8 WPIAL championships, the most recent of which coming in 2016, have appeared in 3 PIAA championship games, and won the 2001 AAA state title.

Throughout this time span, the team has sent several players on to play at NCAA Division I schools and the National Football League. In 2001, the Associated Press named Tyler Palko, son of former head coach Bob Palko, the 2001 Pennsylvania Big School Player of the Year. He was also a member of the USA Today All-America Team (Second-team) and three-time Pittsburgh Post-Gazette WPIAL Class AAA Player of the Year. Palko led his West Allegheny Indians to a PIAA state title in 2001 for AAA in Pennsylvania and has since played for the University of Pittsburgh Panthers and numerous professional teams. Other notable football alums include Dorin Dickerson and C.J. Davis, who both went on to play for Pitt and in the NFL.

Through the 1960s and 1970s West Allegheny shared an intense rivalry with Fort Cherry School District, though this has faded due to an increase in enrollment at West Allegheny and a decrease in enrollment at Fort Cherry, which placed the two schools in different classifications based on school size. More recent and current rivals include Moon, Montour, South Fayette, and Chartiers Valley. Rivals in 5A are Woodland Hills, North Hills and McKeesport

Before the mid-1990s, the Indians competed in Class AA, the third-largest of the four classifications based on enrollment. As the school's enrollment increased, the team was then moved to the AAA level, where in remained through the 2015 season. When the WPIAL and PIAA switched to a six-classification system beginning with the 2016–17 academic year, the football team was placed in class 5A, the second-largest of the six new classifications.

History in the WPIAL and PIAA Playoffs since 1993

Notable alumni
 Tyler Palko – Former NFL quarterback
 Dorin Dickerson- Former NFL tight end
 Scott Patterson – Former MLB pitcher
 C. J. Davis – Former NFL center
 Nick Kolarac – Professional Soccer Player
   Austin Hendrick – baseball outfielder

References

External links
 West Allegheny School District

School districts established in 1949
Education in Pittsburgh area
School districts in Allegheny County, Pennsylvania
1949 establishments in Pennsylvania